Fan Yunruo (7 January 1996 – 2 July 2020) was a professional Go player.

Biography 
In 2016, Fan defeated Lee Sedol in the top 32 of the 21st Samsung Auto Insurance Cup. In this game, he eliminated Shin Jin-seo and Park Junghwan and entered the semi-finals. In 2017, he defeated the 9th dan, the main player of South Korea, Park, and ended the 18th Nongshim Cup.

At about 1 p.m. on 2 July 2020, Fan Yunruo jumped from his home by way of suicide and died. He had been diagnosed with depression during his lifetime.

References 

1996 births
2020 deaths
2020 suicides
Chinese Go players
Go players from Shanghai
Suicides by jumping in China
Suicides in the People's Republic of China